Natalia Guerrero (born September 9, 1987 in Irapuato, Guanajuato, Mexico) is a Mexican actress.

Life and career 
Guerrero was born in Irapuato, Guanajuato, Mexico. In 2011, she graduated from the Centro de Educación Artística de Televisa (CEA). In addition to CEA, she studied at other schools like "Idea" and "Casa Azul."

She began her career as an actress in the 2011 film Así es la suerte. In 2012, she appeared in the telenovelas Amor bravío and Miss XV. As a theater actress, she has participated in Amor en Crimea, Seres incompletos, and El pánico. In 2013, she had a recurring role in the telenovela Libre para amarte starred by singer Gloria Trevi.

In 2014, Guerrero starred in the role of Daniela Suarez in the hit telenovela El color de la pasión, opposite Esmeralda Pimentel and Erick Elias. In 2015, she worked again with Esmeralda Pimentel and takes on a breakthrough role as the antagonist Isabel Cisneros in La vecina with Juan Diego Covarrubias. In 2016, she played the role of Lisete Quiroz in Las amazonas, starring an ensemble cast headed by Danna García and Andrés Palacios. In 2017, she was last seen as Cecilia Acevedo in El vuelo de la victoria starring Paulina Goto.

Filmography

Telenovelas

Anthology

Films

Theatre

References

External links 
 
 
 

1987 births
21st-century Mexican actresses
Actresses from Guanajuato
Living people
Mexican film actresses
Mexican telenovela actresses
Mexican television actresses